The Singapore Land Authority (SLA) is a statutory board under the Ministry of Law of the Government of Singapore. SLA optimises land resources for Singapore's social and economic development.

History
The SLA was formed on 1 June 2001 when the Land Office, Singapore Land Registry, Survey Department and Land Systems Support Unit were merged.

Role
With the vision of 'Limited Land, Unlimited Space', SLA is responsible for maximising Singapore's land resources, by:
 Optimising land and space utilisation,
 Safeguarding property ownership, and
 Promoting the use of land-space data through geospatial.

SLA has two functional roles: developmental and regulatory.
 Developmental: SLA oversees the management of 11,000 hectares of state land and 2,700 state properties. SLA is also responsible for land sales, leasing, land acquisitions and allocation, developing and marketing land-related information and maintaining the national land information database.
 Regulatory: SLA is the national land registration authority, and is responsible for the management and maintenance of the national land survey system, to define the boundaries and legal limits of properties in Singapore.

SLA also operates GeoWorks, Southeast Asia's first geospatial industry centre. As a co-working space, GeoWorks aims to nurture and strengthen the geospatial ecosystem in Singapore and beyond, bringing together MNCs, scale-ups and government agencies through partnership, collaboration and innovation. The GeoWorks GeoInnovation Programme is home to more than 20 startups and scale-ups in geospatial and related domains, including artificial intelligence, drones, autonomous vehicles, augmented reality, virtual reality, geospatial analysis, satellite imagery and route optimisation. GeoWorks is located at mTower.

State-managed Properties
Notable properties managed by SLA include:
Gillman Barracks
Dempsey Hill (former Tanglin Village)
Kallang Airport
Tanjong Pagar Railway Station
Old Bukit Timah Fire Station
Changi Hospital
Temasek Shophouse
Turf City
5 Kadayanallur Street (former St. Andrew’s Mission Hospital)
45 Sultan Gate at Kampong Glam
Close to 500 Black and White Bungalows across Singapore, including Scotts Road, Goodwood Hill, Bukit Timah, Alexandra Park, Sembawang, Malcolm Park, Changi and Seletar
St. John’s Island, Lazarus Island and Kusu Island

See also
SiReNT

References

External links
Singapore Land Authority Official Website
GeoWorks - Singapore's Geospatial Industry Centre
OneMap - authoritative national map of Singapore
State Property Information Online

Statutory boards of the Singapore Government
2001 establishments in Singapore
Government agencies established in 2001
Regulation in Singapore